Girardon is a French surname that may refer to
Catherine Duchemin (later Girardon, 1630–1698), French flower and fruit painter, wife of François Girardon
François Girardon (1628–1715), French sculptor
Michèle Girardon (1938–1975), French actress

French-language surnames